The Twin Miracle, also called the Miracle at Savatthi (Pali), or the Miracle at Śrāvastī (Sanskrit), is one of the miracles of Gautama Buddha. There are two major versions of the story that vary in some details. The Pali account of the miracle can be found in the Dhammapadattakatha and the Sanskrit version in the Pratiharya-sutra. Buddhists believe it was performed seven years after the Buddha's enlightenment, in the ancient Indian city of Savatthi. According to Buddhist texts, during the miracle the Buddha emitted fire from the top half of his body and water from the bottom half of his body simultaneously, before alternating them and then expanding them to illuminate the cosmos. The miracle was performed during a miracle contest between Gautama Buddha and six rival religious teachers. In the Sanskrit Buddhist tradition, it is considered one of the Ten Indispensable Acts that all Buddhas are to perform during their lives, and one of the "Thirty Great Acts" in the Pali commentarial tradition. The miracle itself is said to have been performed twice, with the Buddha performing it once at his home town of Kapilavastu before performing the main miracle at Savatthi. It is considered to have been Gautama Buddha's greatest miracle and something that can only be performed by fully enlightened Buddhas.

The Miracle at Kapilavastu 
According to Buddhist texts, when the Buddha returned to his home kingdom of Kapilavastu following his enlightenment, his fellow tribesman refused to bow to him because he was a junior member of the tribe. In order to ensure that they paid him proper respect as an enlightened one, the Buddha levitates and emits water and fire from his body and alternates their positions. This results in the Buddha's father, King Suddhodana, bowing to him in respect, with the rest of the Shakya Tribe following suit. After the Buddha returns to the ground and sits down it suddenly starts raining, with the rain only falling on people who wanted to get wet, and no rain falling on those who wanted to remain dry. Following this event, the Buddha tells the Vessantara Jātaka.

The Miracle at Savatthi

Background 
According to the Pali version of the story, in the Buddha's time, a wealthy treasurer suspended a sandalwood bowl in the air with a cord, hoping to find an enlightened being who can fly up and take it. For six days, teachers from six other religious sects attempted to trick the treasurer into giving them the bowl, but failed. On the seventh day, news of this reached one of the Buddha's disciples, Pindola Bharadvaja, who then proceeded to fly up and take the bowl, thus converting the treasurer to Buddhism. While on his way back to the monastery, he was asked by people who missed the miracle to perform it again, which he did. 

When the Buddha hears about this, he reprimands Pindola for doing this, and lays down a rule forbidding monks from using supranormal powers for such purposes.  Upon hearing that the Buddha laid down a rule forbidding his monks from showing off miracles, six jealous teachers from rival religious sects try to win back followers by publicly challenging the Buddha to a miracle tournament, thinking he would refuse to perform one. In the Sanskrit account of the event, the sandalwood bowl story is absent and the six jealous teachers, confident in their own supranormal powers, challenge the Buddha to a miracle contest on their own accord in hopes of regaining followers.

The Miracle Tournament 

According to the Pali account of the story, the six rival teachers go to King Bimbisara of Magadha to sponsor the contest. To the rival teachers' surprise, the Buddha accepts the challenge, stating that the rule forbidding miracles applied to his monks but not to him, in the same way that subjects are forbidden from picking from the royal orchard, but not the king himself. In the Sanskrit version of the story, the rival teachers go first to King Bimbasara to host the contest but are turned down, and then go to King Pasenadi of Kosala who agrees to host the tournament if the Buddha agrees. In this version, the Buddha advises his followers against doing such miracles, but states he will do this miracle because all Buddhas are supposed to perform the twin miracle.    

The Buddha declares that he will perform the miracle at the foot of a mango tree in Savatthi on the full moon day of Asalha Puja in four months time. According to the Pali version of the story; the rival teachers, desperate to avoid the contest, uproot all of the mango trees in the area prior to the miracle tournament. On the day of the tournament, a royal gardener finds a mango on the floor that he prepares to give to the king, but upon seeing the Buddha walk by, he gives it to the Buddha instead. When the time of the miracle contest approaches, the Buddha eats the mango and plants the seed in front of the city gate, after washing his hands over the area, a full mango tree immediately grows. In the Sanskrit version of the event, the mango story is absent, but the Buddha instead performs other precursor miracles in the days prior to the tournament, including manipulating air to put out a fire and restoring the hands and feet of King Pasenadi's brother, who lost his hands and feet for a crime he didn't commit.  

The Buddha starts by creating a jeweled walkway in midair and prepares to perform the miracle for the crowd of observers, but is interrupted by several of his disciples, who ask to perform a miracle in his place to save him the trouble. The disciples each propose a different miracle for them to perform in the Buddha's place but he refuses each request. Finally Maha Moggallana, the Buddha's chief disciple foremost in psychic powers, offers to perform a miracle in his place but the Buddha still refuses. He then states that he must perform the miracle himself, as it is one of the duties of a Buddha. Standing on top of the jeweled walkway, the Buddha enters a meditative state and emits fire from the top half of his body and streams of water from the lower half and then starts alternating the fire and water between the positions, creating an array of six colors. The fire and water then shoot up to illuminate the cosmos to the applause of the audience while the Buddha teaches the Dhamma to the observers as he walks along on the jeweled walkway. The Sanskrit version also includes the Buddha creating several duplicates of himself that fill the air during the miracle, with some walking, lying down, and sitting. 

At the conclusion of the miracle, it is the rival religious leaders' turn to perform a miracle but they are unable to move. A strong wind knocks down the pavilion they prepared for the tournament and the rival teachers flee, with one committing suicide. The Buddha continues the miracle and proceeds to create a single duplicate of himself and then have the duplicate ask him questions which he would in turn answer in order to teach the observing audience.

Following the miracle, the Buddha is said to have ascended to Tavatimsa Heaven for three months to spend his rains-retreat and teach his deceased mother the Abhidhamma, in accordance with what all Buddhas are believed to have done after performing the miracle.

References

Further reading
Brown, Robert L. (1984). The Śrāvastī Miracles in the Art of India and Dvāravatī, Archives of Asian Art 37, 79-95 
Foucher, Alfred (1914). The Great Miracle at Sravasti in the Beginnings of Buddhist Art, Paris: P. Geuthner, pp. 147-284.

External links
Buddhist Legends The Twin Miracle

Gautama Buddha
Buddhist miracles